Ping Chong (born 1946) is an American contemporary theater director, choreographer, video and installation artist. He was born in Toronto and raised in the Chinatown section of New York City. Chong is internationally recognized as a director, and a creator of interdisciplinary theater work. He is an early pioneer of interdisciplinary theater and the integration of media into it. Chong is considered a seminal figure in Asian American theater and the Asian American arts movement.

Career and works
Originally trained as a visual artist and filmmaker at the School of Visual Arts and Pratt Institute, Chong studied dance/performance with Meredith Monk and began his theatrical career as a member of Meredith Monk's company, The House in 1971. Chong was both a performer and collaborator in Monk's company. His co-created work include The Travelogue Series: Paris 1972, Chacon 1974, and Venice/Milan 1976. His final collaboration with Monk was The Games 1983 which premiered at the Schaubuhne in Berlin, West Germany. He created his first independent theatre work, Lazarus in 1972. In this very 1st work Chong's interest in an interdisciplinary approach to theater as a guiding principal is apparent. His roots are in the visual arts, in film, in dance and in the Chinese Opera (both his grandfather and father were director/librettists). Central to Ping Chong's work is the theme of Otherness. As a non-white, immigrant and an artist growing up in a highly segregated NYC and white art world it is no surprise that this theme proved central to his work. In the earliest works such as Lazarus (1972), Fear and Loathing in Gotham (1975), and Humboldt's Current (1977), the theme of Otherness reflected Chong's personal sense of estrangement from the society he grew up in as a first generation immigrant. Later the theme of Otherness became more universal, encompassing a broader range of material. Many of Chong's works concern colonialism and the collision of cultures and/or issues of cultural diversity, and frequently draw on documentary and interview-based materials (as in the Undesirable Elements series.)

Ping Chong + Company (originally called The Fiji Theatre Company) was founded in 1975. The company's mission is "to explore the meaning of contemporary theatre and art on a national and international level," and "to create and tour innovative multi-disciplinary works of theater and art, which explore the intersections of history, race, art and technology in the modern world." The company has created and toured more than 100 works by Chong and his collaborators, which have been presented at major theaters, performing arts centers, and arts festivals around the world.

Key works in Chong's evolution in chronological order include Humboldt's Current (1977) from his first decade. It is an early work anticipating Chong's interest in geopolitical and historical subjects. It received an Obie award. In 1980 Ping Chong formed a small ensemble and it is with this group of performers which includes, Jeannie Hutchins, Louise Smith, John Fleming, and Brian Hallas that he evolved his performance style. A.M./A.M - The Articulated Man (1981) marked Chong's full bloom interest in evolving a choreographic, non-literary kind of theater. This, The 2nd decade of Ping Chong's works include 3 major works back to back. Nosferatu, A Symphony of Darkness (1985), a work straddling the allegorical with Chong's increasing interest in art as activism. This was followed by another dance/theater work Angels of Swedenborg (1985) and Kind Ness (1986), two very different works though nevertheless informed by a strong physicality. Both works speak to in very different ways, Chong's lifelong engagement with the profound issue of Otherness. Kind Ness was the recipient of a USA Playwright's Award in 1988. The 1990s, marked major changes and innovations in Ping Chong's work. It is at this time that he disbanded his decade old ensemble in order to explore new directions and collaborations. While the works of the early decades were devised, Chong would have a much more active role in writing new work often in collaboration with a partner. From 1990 with the East/West Quartet: Deshima (1990), Chinoiserie (1996), After Sorrow (1997), Pojagi (1999) and in 1992 with the launch of the Undesirable Elements series the work took a 180 degree turn toward poetic documentary and historical subjects. The exception to this are the puppet theater works beginning with Kwaidan (1998) which largely nods toward Chong's earlier allegorical works.

Ping Chong's early interest in puppetry starting with Lazarus in 1972 was given full expression in the creation of large scale productions of puppet theatre works including, Kwaidan (1998) which received Unima-USA's Citation of Excellence in the Art of Puppetry, Obon: Tales of Rain and Moonlight (2002), the sequel to Kwaidan, and Cathay: Three Tales of China (2005), Kwaidan and Obon were both based on Kwaidan, Japanese ghost stories collected and adapted by Lafcadio Hearn. Cathay, commission by the Kennedy Center for the Performing Arts was set in China and used three interconnected stories to explore three eras of Chinese history: the Tang Dynasty, the Second Sino-Japanese War|Japanese invasion during World War II, and contemporary China today. Cathay was named one of the Top 10 Shows of the 2005-2006 Season by NY Theatre Wire, and was awarded three Henry Hewes Awards for achievement in theatrical design.

Since 1992, Chong and his collaborators has created over 70 works in the Undesirable Elements project, an ongoing series of oral-history theater works exploring issues of race, culture, and identity in the lives of individuals in specific communities. The development process includes an extended residency and rehearsal period during which Ping Chong and collaborators conduct intensive interviews with potential participants who are not generally performers, from the local community. These interviews then form the basis of a script, performed by the interviewees, that covers the historical and personal narratives of individuals who are in some way living between two cultures. Chong has often described the series as, "Seated operas for the spoken word." One of the most recent entries in the series is Beyond Sacred: Voices of Muslim Identity which started touring in 2016. Beyond Sacred is an interview-based theatre production exploring the diverse experiences of Muslim communities in the United States. The five cast members of Beyond Sacred vary in many ways, but share the common experience of coming of age in a post-9/11 New York City, at a time of increasing Islamophobia. They are young men and women that reflect a wide range of Muslim identities, including those who have converted to Islam, those who were raised Muslim, but have since left the faith, those who identify as “culturally” Muslim, and those who are observant on a daily basis. It stars Tiffany Yasmin Abdelghani, Ferdous Dehqan, Kadin Herring, Amir Khafagy and Maha Syed.

In 2014, Chong and dramaturg/director/playwright Talvin Wilks created Collidescope: Adventures in Pre- and Post-Racial America in collaboration with undergraduate and graduate designers and actors in the University of Maryland School of Theatre, Dance, and Performance Studies. Of the work, Chong says, "In response to the recent killings of Trayvon Martin, shooting of Jordan Davis|Jordan Davis, shooting of Michael Brown and the seemingly endless killings of black men and boys for unarmed offenses, we have designed Collidescope to be a collision-course view of the legacy and psyche behind this history of racial violence, racism and social injustice in America." Subsequent adaptations have performed at the University of Massachusetts Amherst and Wake Forest University.

There are aspects of Chong's prolific career that have remained under the radar. Primarily an artist of the theater he also, when the opportunity arose created works of video art, pure dance works, and installations. The two dance works are, I Will Not be Sad In This World (1991), Baldwin/NOW (2016). Video works include the video adaptation of I Will Not Be Sad In This World (1992) and Plage Concrete (1988). His installation work includes Kind Ness not to be confused with his play Kind Ness, a commission by MIT's List Visual Arts Center in its inaugural season in 1985. Another highlight of Chong's installation work was Testimonial commissioned for the Venice Bienalle.

Works in Chronological Order

 A Universal History of Infamy: Variations on Nocturne in 1200 Seconds, 2020, Visual Art and Installation, Film and Media, in collaboration with Kenya Bullock, Jaime Sunwoo, Matt Chilton, Zakaria Khafagy and Irisdelia Garcia
 Nocturne Remix 2020, Film and Media,in collaboration with Edwin Aguila, Kenya Bullock, Irisdelia Garcia and Zakaria Khafagy
 Collidescope 4.0 (University of Minnesota), 2019, Theater, in collaboration with Talvin Wilks
 Difficult Lives, 2019, Theater, in collaboration with Hiromi Sakamoto and the cast
 ALAXSXA | ALASKA, 2017, Theater,in collaboration with Ryan Conarro, Justin Perkins & Gary Upay'aq Beaver (Central Yup'ik)
 Cage Is Stage, 2017, Visual Art and Installation, in collaboration with Danny Yunh
 Collidescope 3.0 (Wake Forest University), 2017, Theater, in collaboration with Talvin Wilks
 Collidescope 2.0 (UMass Amherst), 2016, Theater, in collaboration with Talvin Wilks
 Baldwin/NOW, 2016, Dance, in collaboration with the ensemble
 PUSH! Real Athletes. Real Stories. Real Theatre., 2015, Theater, in collaboration with Sara Zatz and the performers
 Beyond Sacred: Voices of Muslim Identity, 2015, Theater, in collaboration with Sara Zatz, Ryan Conarro, and the performers
 Collidescope: Adventures in Pre- and Post-Racial America, 2014, Theater, in collaboration with Talvin Wilks
 Brooklyn '63, 2013, Theater, in collaboration with Talvin Wilks and the performers
 Angels of Swedenborg (2011), 2011, Dance, in collaboration with John Fleming
 The Devil You Know, 2010, Puppetry, Theater
 Cry for Peace: Voices From The Congo, 2010, Theater, in collaboration with Kyle Bass, Sara Zatz, and the performers
 Throne of Blood, 2010, Theater
 Invisible Voices: New Perspectives On Disability, 2009, Theater, in collaboration with Sara Zatz and the performers
 The Women of the Hill, 2009, Theater, in collaboration with Talvin Wilks and the cast
 Secret History: The Philadelphia Story, 2009, Theater, in collaboration with Sara Zatz and the performers
 Delta Rising, 2008, Theater, in collaboration with Talvin Wilks and the cast
 Inside/Out...voices from the disability community, 2008, Theater, in collaboration with Sara Zatz and the performers
 Tales from the Salt City, 2008, Theater, in collaboration with Sara Zatz and the performers
 Undesirable Elements/Asian America, 2007, Theater, in collaboration with Sara Zatz and the performers
 Cocktail, 2007, Theater, in collaboration with Vince LiCata
 Six Lives, 2007, Theater, in collaboration with Sara Zatz, Bonnie Morris, Michael Robins, and the performers
 Testimonial II, 2006, Visual Art and Installation, in collaboration with Michiki Okaya
 Native Voices-Secret History, 2005, Theater, in collaboration with Sara Zatz and the performers
 Undesirable Elements/Ten Years Later, 2005, Theater, in collaboration with Sara Zatz, the performers, Sean Kelley-Pegg, Bonnie Morris, and Mai Moua
 Undesirable Elements/Albuquerque, 2005, Theater, in collaboration with Sara Zatz and the performers
 Cathay: Three Tales of China, 2005–2012, Puppetry
 Secret Histories: Seattle Youth, 2004, Theater, in collaboration with Sara Zatz and the performers
 BLIND NESS: The Irresistible Light of Encounter, 2004, Theater, Puppetry, Circus, in collaboration with Michael Rohd, Bobby Bermea, Jeff Randall, and Burke Walker
 Secret History: Journeys Abroad, Journeys Within, 2004, Theater, in collaboration with Leyla Modirzadeh, Sara Zatz, and the cast
 God Favors The Predator, 2004, Theater, in collaboration with Michael Rohd
 La Clemenza Di Tito, 2003, Music and Opera
 Undesirable Elements/Pioneer Valley, 2003, Theater,  in collaboration Talvin Wilks and the cast
 Undesirable Elements/Hanover, 2002, Theater, in collaboration with Michael Rohd and the cast
 Undesirable Elements/Berlin, 2002, Theater, in collaboration with Michael Rohd and the cast
 UE 92/02, 2002, Theater, in collaboration Talvin Wilks and the cast
 Children of War, 2002, Theater, in collaboration with the cast
 Reason, 2002, Theater, in collaboration with Michael Rohd
 EDDA: Viking Tales of Lust, Greed and Family, 2001–2002, Theater, in collaboration with Victoria Abras
 Undesirable Elements/Madison, WI, 2001, Theater, in collaboration with the cast
 Undesirable Elements/Atlanta, 2001, Theater, in collaboration Talvin Wilks and the cast
 Secret Histories/Charleston, 2001, Theater, in collaboration Talvin Wilks and the cast
 Obon: Tales of Rain and Moonlight, 2002–2003, Puppetry, Theater
 Secret History, 2000, Theater
 Undesirable Elements/Washington DC, 2000, Theater, in collaboration with Michael Rohd and the cast
 Undesirable Elements/Chicago, 1999, Theater,  in collaboration with Michael Rohd and the cast
 Undesirable Elements/East Harlem, 1999, Theater, in collaboration with Emerald Trinket Monsod, the cast, and Alain Jezequel
 Undesirable Elements/Hamilton College, 1999, Theater, in collaboration with the cast
 Pojagi, 1999–2000, Theater
 Undesirable Elements: A/P/A, 1999, Theater, in collaboration with the cast
 SlutForArt, 1999-2002, Dance, Theater, in collaboration with Muna Tseng
 Truth and Beauty, 1999–2005, Theater, in collaboration with Michae Rohd and Jeff Randall
 Undesirable Elements/Newark, 1998, Theater, in collaboration with the cast
 Nocturne in 1200 Seconds, 1998, Theater
 Undesirable Elements/Seattle, 1998, Theater, in collaboration with the cast
 Kwaidan, 1998–2000, Theater, Puppetry
 Undesirable Elements/Yellow Springs, 1997, Theater,  in collaboration with the cast
 Undesirable Elements/Rotterdam, 1997, Theater, in collaboration with Dave Schwab and the cast
 Undesirable Elements/Los Angeles, 1997, Theater, in collaboration with David Mohrmann and the cast
 After Sorrow, 1997–1998, Dance, Theater in collaboration with Muna Tseng
 Curlew River, 1997, Music and Opera
 98.6: A Convergence in 15 Minutes, 1996-2007, Dance, Theater
 Interfacing Joan, 1996–1997, Theater, written by Louise Smith
 Undesirable Elements/Tokyo (Gaijin), 1995, Theater, in collaboration with Hiromi Sakamoto and the cast
 Testimonial, 1995, Visual Art and Installation, in collaboration with Fumio Nanjo and Dana Friis-Hansen
 Persuasion, 1994, Theater, in collaboration with Anne Basting and Vince LiCata
 Chinoiserie, 1994–1995, Music and Opera, Theater,  in collaboration with Michael Matthews, Regine Anna Seckinger and Ric Oquita
 Undesirable Elements/Twin Cities, 1994, Theater, in collaboration with Emerald Trinket Monsod, Cochise Anderson, and the cast
 Undesirable Elements/New York, 1993, Theater, in collaboration with the cast
 Undesirable Elements/Cleveland, 1993, Theater, in collaboration with the cast
 American Gothic, 1992, Theater
 A Facility for the Containment and Channeling of Undesirable Elements, 1992, Visual Art and Installation, in collaboration with Carlos Solanas
 I Will Not Be Sad in This World, 1991/2008, Dance, Film and Media
 Elephant Memories, 1990–1994, Theater,  in collaboration with performers and designers
 Deshima, 1990–1996, Theater, Dance, in collaboration with  Michael Matthews
 Tempus Fugit, 1990, Visual Art and Installation, in collaboration with Curtis Carter
 4AM America, 1990–1991, Theater
 Noiresque: The Fallen Angel, 1989, Theater
 Brightness, 1989, Circus, in collaboration with Louise Smith, the designers, and the performers
 In The Absence of Memory, 1989, Visual Art and Installation
 Skin - A State of Being, 1989, Theater, in collaboration with the cast
 Quartetto, 1988, Theater, in collaboration with Michael Matthews
 Snow, 1988, Theater
 Plage Concrete, 1988, Visual Art and Installation, in collaboration with Gary Garrels and Jock Reynolds
 Without Law, Without Heaven, 1987, Theater, written by Norman Duke
 Maraya - Acts of Nature in Geological Time, 1987–1988, Theater
 KIND NESS, 1986–1993, Theater, in collaboration with the cast
 Nosferatu, 1985–1991/2017, Theater, in collaboration with the cast
 Angels of Swedenborg, 1985–1989, Dance, Theater in collaboration with John Fleming
 Kind Ness, 1985, Visual Art and Installation, in collaboration with Katy Kline
 A Race, 1983–1984, Theater
 Astonishment and The Twins, 1984–1987, Theater, in collaboration with  Louise Smith
 Anna Into Nightlight, 1982–1983, Dance, Film and Media, Puppetry, Theater
 Nuit Blanche, A Select View of Earthlings, 1981–1985, Theater, in collaboration with Louise Smith, John Miglietta, Tone Blevins, and Pablo Vela
 A.M./A.M. - The Articulated Man, 1981–1985, Dance, Theater
 Rainer and the Knife, 1981–1982, Theater, in collaboration with Rob List
 Humboldt's Current, 1977–1980, Theater
 Fear and Loathing in Gotham, 1975–1982, Theater
 I Flew to Fiji, You Went South, 1973, Theater
 Lazarus, 1972–1980, Theater

References

External links
Works in Chronological Order

1946 births
Living people
People from Toronto
Canadian choreographers
American theatre directors
Canadian emigrants to the United States
American theatre directors of Chinese descent
American people of Chinese descent
Canadian people of Chinese descent
Artists from New York City
American choreographers
Bessie Award winners